Askar is a Palestinian refugee camp. It is located on the outskirts of the West Bank city of Nablus and was established in 1950 on 119 dunums of land. Residents of the camp refer to this as “New Askar”.

History

Ancient period 
Askar is identified with Ein Sukkar, an ancient settlement featured in the Mishnah and Talmud, as well as in the New Testament. Thanks to its fertility, the Ein Sukkar Valley is mentioned in Rabbinic literature as a place from which the grain was brought as a wave offering to the Temple when no barley was found in a place closer to Jerusalem. In later years, a Samaritan settlement was established on the site; according to ancient Samaritan writings, the town was inhabited by Samaritan High Priests. A Samaritan mausoleum, still in use during the fourth century CE, was found at the site.

The name Askar preserves the ancient name of Ein Sukkar.

Schenke believed that Askar was first settled during the early Iron Age. However, Campbell dated the settlement to the Hellenistic period.

Modern history 
During the Second Intifada and 2002 Operation Defensive Shield, camps such as Askar were a source of considerable resistance from Palestinian gunmen. IDF incursions are still common in Askar refugee camp and are generally conducted for the purposes of interrogating individuals or arresting suspected militants who Israeli authorities consider to be affiliated with listed terrorist organisations.

The UNRWA has several installations in Askar refugee camp including schools and health clinics. In addition to these, the camp has several of its own community centers including the Center of Peace and Development located in New Askar. International volunteer work camps are run at the center annually which are hosted by the An-Najah National University.

According to the United Nations Relief and Works Agency, the camps registered population is 31,629. Food rations are distributed to approximately 2086 families.

References

External links
Welcome To 'Askar R.C.
 Askar,  UNWRA
Nablus City Profile, Applied Research Institute–Jerusalem, ARIJ
Development Priorities and Needs in Nablus, ARIJ

Populated places established in 1950
Palestinian refugee camps in the West Bank
Nablus Governorate
Ancient Samaritan settlements